Since acceding to the throne of Thailand in 1946, King Bhumibol Adulyadej has made a number of state and official visits.

1959

1960

1962

1963

1964

1966

1967

1994

References

Bhumibol Adulyadej
Bhumibol
Foreign relations of Thailand
Bhumibol
State visits